Patrick Simon (born August 25, 1992) is an American professional basketball player for Toyoda Gosei Scorpions in Japan.

References

1992 births
Living people
American expatriate basketball people in Germany
American expatriate basketball people in Japan
Ehime Orange Vikings players
Salt Lake City Stars players
Toyoda Gosei Scorpions players
Basketball players from Spokane, Washington
American men's basketball players
Power forwards (basketball)
Ehingen Urspring players